Abdal is a rank of forty Sufi saints in Islamic metaphysics and mysticism.

Abdal may also refer to:

Places
 Abdal, Azerbaijan, a village in the Agdam District of Azerbaijan
 Abdal, Punjab, a village in Amritsar Dist. of Indian state of Punjab
 Abdal, Gurdaspur, Punjab, a village in Gurdaspur Dist. of Indian state of Punjab
 Abdal, Iran, a village in Zanjan Province, Iran
 Abdal, Nebraska, a ghost town in the United States

Other uses
 Abdal (caste), a Muslim community found in North India
 Abdals (ethnic group in West Asia), an ethnic group in Turkey, Syria, and the Balkans
 Qara Shemsi Abdal (1828–1886), a 19th-century Ottoman poet
 Äynu people of Xinjiang region, China
 Äynu language, the language of the Äynu
 Hephthalites were sometimes referred to as Abdals

See also
 Dervish, a Sufi ascetic
 Abdul, component of many names from Arabic
 Abdali (disambiguation)